Elysium is a 2013 American dystopian science fiction action film written, produced, and directed by Neill Blomkamp. It was Blomkamp's second directorial effort. The film stars Matt Damon and Jodie Foster alongside Sharlto Copley, Alice Braga, Diego Luna, Wagner Moura, and William Fichtner. The film takes place on both a ravaged Earth and a luxurious artificial world (Stanford torus design, one of the proposed NASA designs) called Elysium. The film itself offers deliberate social commentary that explores political and sociological themes such as immigration, overpopulation, transhumanism, health care, worker exploitation, the justice system, technology, and social class issues.

It received positive reviews, but critics considered it to be disappointing after Blomkamp's first film, District 9. It grossed $286 million and was released on DVD and Blu-ray on December 17, 2013.

Plot
In 2154, Earth is overpopulated, diseased, and polluted. The planet’s citizens live in poverty while the rich and powerful live on Elysium, an orbiting space station just outside of Earth’s atmosphere. 

Spider, a hacker living on Earth in Los Angeles, runs three space shuttle flights to Elysium to smuggle people in to use their Med-Bays, devices that can heal any disease or condition. Elysium Defense Secretary Delacourt shoots down two of the spacecraft in space, killing everyone on board, and has everyone on the shuttle that does reach Elysium arrested and deported. Elysium President Patel reprimands Delacourt for her actions, threatening discharge for any more actions of a similar manner. In retaliation, she offers Armadyne Corp CEO John Carlyle defense contracts for life in exchange for a program that will allow Delacourt to conduct a coup and install herself as president. Carlyle writes the program and stores it inside his brain.  

On Earth, parolee Max Da Costa is working for Armadyne Corp as a laborer when he is accidentally exposed to a lethal dose of radiation. He is given medication and told he has five days to live after being dismissed by Carlyle from Armadyne. Max and his friend Julio approach Spider and make a deal: If Max can successfully steal information from a powerful Elysium citizen, in exchange Spider will give Max a shuttle ride to Elysium to use a Med-Bay to cure his condition. Max demands that the target be his former boss John Carlyle. Due to his health, Spider provides Max with a powerful exoskeleton via surgery to significantly increase his strength and stamina. Max and Julio shoot down Carlyle's shuttle to Elysium and extract the program from his brain. Delacourt sends a black ops team led by Agent Kruger (whose contract Patel had terminated for shooting the shuttles down) to retrieve it. Kruger kills Julio but an injured Max escapes with a copy of the coup program while Carlyle's death destroys any possibility of further retrieval from his brain.

Max seeks help from his childhood friend and nurse, Frey, who patches him up. Max goes to Spider, who realizes what the data in Max's head is worth; Delacourt locks down all flights up to Elysium, leaving Spider unable to take Max. Max angrily leaves, though not before Spider is able to discreetly place a tracking device on Max. After Kruger kidnaps Frey and her daughter, Max approaches him and offers him the data in exchange for the use of a Med-Bay. Kruger accepts and Delacourt lifts the lockdown so the group can travel to Elysium. During the flight, Kruger and Max fight over the data and a grenade explodes in Kruger's face, damaging the ship. The ship then crashes on Elysium; Max is arrested and taken to Delacourt, who orders a team to extract the data. Max escapes and heads to the armory to save Frey, who has been turned over to Kruger's men. Kruger is revived by a Med-Bay and confronted by Delacourt, whom he fatally wounds. He orders his men to start killing the politicians on the station while he dons a more advanced exoskeleton suit to hunt down Max, planning to initiate the coup protocol for himself.

Spider lands on Elysium and finds Max. Spider makes a deal with Max to have his men protect Frey and get her daughter to a Med-Bay in exchange for the data. They make their way to the computer core, where they are confronted by Kruger. Max and Kruger engage in a brutal fight, which ends with Max managing to disable Kruger's connection to his suit; Kruger responds by attempting murder/suicide via grenade, but Max is able to overcome this.  Kruger subsequently dies. Spider and Max connect to the computer and Spider realizes that the data will kill Max if he downloads it. Max says his goodbyes to Frey and initiates the download, which kills him but allows Frey to heal her daughter. The police arrive but are unable to arrest Spider, as everyone on Earth is now considered a citizen of Elysium. Medical shuttles loaded with Med-Bays are dispatched to Earth to begin healing everyone that needs help.

Cast
 Matt Damon as Max Da Costa, a former criminal now on probation. Max was raised in an orphanage with Frey and promised her that one day he would take her to Elysium.
 Maxwell Perry Cotton as young Max
 Jodie Foster as Defense Secretary Jessica Delacourt. She is responsible for the security on Elysium and resorts to illegal means to keep immigrants off of the torus.
 Sharlto Copley as Agent M. Kruger, a black ops agent working secretly for Delacourt. He is a psychopathic killer with a reputation for using extreme measures.  
 Alice Braga as Frey Santiago, Max’s childhood best friend. She works as a nurse and is a single mother to a daughter with leukemia.
 Valentina Giron as young Frey  
 Diego Luna as Julio, Max's best friend.
 Wagner Moura as Spider, a hacker and information thief who runs clandestine flights to Elysium.  
 William Fichtner as John Carlyle. He is CEO of Armadyne Corp, the company that designed and built Elysium.  
 Brandon Auret as Drake, one of Kruger's soldiers.
 Josh Blacker as Crowe, one of Kruger's soldiers.
 Faran Tahir as President Patel, leader of Elysium.
 Emma Tremblay as Matilda Santiago, Frey's daughter who is dying of cancer.
 Jose Pablo Cantillo as Sandro, one of Spider's hackers.
 Adrian Holmes as Manuel
 Jared Keeso as Rico
 Carly Pope, Ona Grauer and Michael Shanks as CCB agents
 Terry Chen as CCB Technician

Production
Elysium was produced by Bill Block, Neill Blomkamp, and Simon Kinberg, and written and directed by Neill Blomkamp, the director and co-writer of District 9 (2009). It reunites Blomkamp with some of his District 9 crew, such as editor Julian Clarke, production designer Philip Ivey, cinematographer Trent Opaloch, and actor Sharlto Copley, playing one of the film's antagonists. Elysium is a co-production of TriStar Pictures and MRC.

Although the film's story is set in 2154, Blomkamp has stated that it is a comment on the contemporary human condition. "Everybody wants to ask me lately about my predictions for the future," the director has said, "No, no, no. This isn't science fiction. This is today. This is now." In January 2011, independent studio Media Rights Capital met with major studios to distribute Elysium, and Blomkamp shared art designs of his proposed science fiction film. The art designs won over the executives at Sony Pictures, who bought the film after making a more attractive offer than the other studios.

The film's Earth-bound scenes were shot in a dump in the poor Iztapalapa district on the outskirts of Mexico City. The scenes for Elysium were shot in Vancouver and the wealthy Huixquilucan-Interlomas suburbs of Mexico City. Matt Damon shaved his head for the role of Max. The main role was first offered to Watkin Tudor Jones (Ninja), a South African rapper, who, despite being a fan of District 9 and having a D9 tattoo on his inner lip, did not take the role.

The role was then offered to rapper Eminem, but he wanted the film to be shot in Detroit. That was not an option for the two studios and so Blomkamp moved on to Damon as his next choice. Futuristic designs were executed by Philip Ivey after long periods of researching and studying older science fiction films. Ivey has continuously cited Syd Mead as a substantial influence for the film.

Weta Workshop created the exosuits for Damon and Copley's characters, while the complicated visual effects were handled primarily by Image Engine (who also collaborated on District 9) with additional work by Whiskytree, MPC, The Embassy and Industrial Light and Magic, some of the software that was used for the visual effects were Autodesk Softimage. Re-shoots took place through October 2012. The film's music score was composed by newcomer Ryan Amon and recorded at Abbey Road Studios with the Philharmonia Orchestra. The soundtrack was released on August 6, 2013.

Lawsuit
In October 2013, a lawsuit was filed by Steve Wilson Briggs accusing the crew of copyright infringement, claiming he wrote a screenplay that was substantially similar to the movie. Several months before filing a lawsuit, he registered his screenplay with the U.S. Copyright Office to file an infringement complaint.

On 3 October 2014, the U.S. District Court for the Northern District of California found in favour of the film's producers.

Release
When the film was first announced, Sony intended to release it in late 2012. In October 2012, Sony then announced they had pushed back the release date to  2013. In April 2013, Sony also announced that the film would be specifically reformatted for IMAX theaters. By that time, two theatrical trailers and a TV spot had already been showcased. Elysium was originally released on DVD and Blu-ray on December 17, 2013 and later released on Ultra HD Blu-ray on February 9, 2021 by Sony Pictures Home Entertainment.

Reception

Box office
Elysium grossed $93.1 million in North America and $193.1 million in other territories for a worldwide total of $286.1 million, against a production budget of $115 million. It made a net profit of $18 million, when factoring together all expenses and revenues for the film.

The film opened on August 9, 2013, and grossed $11.1 million on its opening day, ranking No. 1. It proceeded to rank No. 1 for the weekend, grossing $29.8 million.

Critical response
The review aggregator website Rotten Tomatoes gives the film an approval rating of 65% based on 262 reviews and an average rating of 6.5/10. The site's critical consensus reads, "After the heady sci-fi thrills of District 9, Elysium is a bit of a comedown for director Neill Blomkamp, but on its own terms, it delivers just often enough to satisfy." On Metacritic, the film has a weighted average score of 61 out of 100, based on 47 critics, indicating "generally favorable reviews". Audiences polled by CinemaScore gave the film an average grade of "B" on an A+ to F scale.

In February 2015, while promoting his newest film, Chappie, director Neill Blomkamp expressed some regrets regarding Elysium, commenting: I feel like I fucked it up, I feel like ultimately the story is not the right story... I still think the satirical idea of a ring, filled with rich people, hovering above the impoverished Earth, is an awesome idea. I love it so much, I almost want to go back and do it correctly. But I just think the script wasn't... I just didn't make a good enough film is ultimately what it is. I feel like I executed all of the stuff that could be executed, like costume and set design and special effects very well. But, ultimately, it was all resting on a somewhat not totally formed skeletal system, so the script just wasn't there; the story wasn't fully there.In a research article entitled "Elysium as a Critical Dystopia", Tanner Mirrlees and Isabel Pedersen argue that "Elysium communicates a 'critical dystopia' that illuminates and interrogates present day global capitalism's worst social, political, ecological and technological conditions, but shows them being resisted and changed, for the better."

Awards

Art Directors Guild 2014

Golden Schmoes Awards 2013

Hollywood Film Awards 2013

IGN Summer Movie Awards 2013

Jupiter Award 2014

Leo Awards 2014

Satellite Awards 2013

Visual Effects Society Awards 2014

Soundtrack
 Ghosst – Performed by Lorn
 Robot Eater – Performed by Gambit
 The Pining Pt2 – Performed by Chris Clark (as Clark) with Martina Topley-Bird
 We Got More (Kilon TeK Remix) – Performed by Brendan Angelides (as Eskmo)
 Metropolis (Dan Le Sac Remix) – Performed by PRDCTV
 Piano Sonata No. 8 in C minor 'Pathetique' – Adagio Cantabile - Written by Ludwig van Beethoven
 Suite For Solo Cello No.1 BWV 1007 – Written by Johann Sebastian Bach
 Kou Kou – Performed by Palms Down Percussion
 Twitch (It Grows and It Grows) – Performed by Raffertie
 Piano Concerto No. 4 in G Major – Rondo Vivace - Written by Ludwig van Beethoven
 Bio Techno – Written and performed by Audio Android
 Loner – Performed by Burial
 New World Disorder – Performed by Arkasia
 Six Degrees – Performed by Kryptic Minds
 Stjernekiggeri – Written and Performed by Mike Sheridan
 Sierra Leone – Performed by Mt Eden
 Elysium – Performed by Ryan Amon

See also
 List of films featuring space stations
 List of films featuring powered exoskeletons
 List of films featuring drones
 List of science fiction films
 Grey: Digital Target

References

External links
 
 
 
 
 

2013 films
2013 action drama films
2013 science fiction action films
American science fiction action films
American action drama films
2010s English-language films
2010s Spanish-language films
2010s French-language films
Films directed by Neill Blomkamp
Drone films
American dystopian films
Cyberpunk films
Films about cancer
Films about coups d'état
Films about immigration
Films about orphans
Films about poverty in the United States
Films about rebellions
Films about social class
Films set in the 22nd century
Films set in Los Angeles
Films shot in Mexico
Films shot in Surrey
Films shot in Vancouver
IMAX films
Films using motion capture
Postcyberpunk films
Overpopulation fiction
Media Rights Capital films
QED International films
TriStar Pictures films
Films produced by Bill Block
Fiction set in the 2150s
Brain–computer interfacing in fiction
2010s American films